Clusia portlandiana is a species of flowering plant in the family Clusiaceae. It is found only in Jamaica. It is threatened by habitat loss.

References

portlandiana
Vulnerable plants
Endemic flora of Jamaica
Taxonomy articles created by Polbot
Plants described in 1958